Panagiotis (Panos) Gavalas (Greek: Πάνος Γαβαλάς; October 26, 1926 – December 3, 1988) was a Greek singer.

Discography

References

The first version of the article is translated from the article at the Greek Wikipedia (Main page)

1926 births
1988 deaths
20th-century Greek male singers
Greek laïko singers
Singers from Athens